Leticia Herrera may refer to:

 Juana Leticia Herrera Ale (born 1960), Mexican politician
 Leticia Herrera Sánchez (born 1949), Nicaraguan lawyer, guerrilla leader, and politician